Computer Ghosts is a 1987 Australian film,. It was shot under the titles Crooksnatchers and Hold the Circus.

References

External links

Australian fantasy comedy films
Films scored by Chris Neal (songwriter)
1980s English-language films
1988 films
1980s Australian films